The Rolls-Royce 100 EX and the 101 EX, with 'EX' standing for experimental models, are two related concept cars developed by Rolls-Royce Motor Cars and first shown at the Geneva International Auto Show in 2004 and 2006 respectively.

100EX: main features
9.0 litre V16 engine 
6-speed automatic transmission
Dimensions: 
Height 
Width  
Length 

The 100 EX concept was produced, and presented in 2004, to celebrate the 100th anniversary of the meeting of businessman Charles Rolls and engineer Sir Henry Royce in 1904.

Rolls-Royce 101EX

In 2006, the 101EX, a grand tourer coupe prototype that directly followed the 100EX concept of a possible new line-topping two-door Rolls-Royce, was presented at the 2006 Geneva International Auto Show.

The 101EX shares its aluminium space frame chassis technology with the 2003 Phantom, albeit in a shortened version. The car is  shorter than the Phantom saloon, with a lower roofline and shallower glass area. Power comes from the BMW 6.75L V12 engine.

The updated body styling of the 101EX would eventually serve as the basis for the Phantom Drophead Coupé and Phantom Coupé. The latter car was featured in the film Johnny English Reborn, and for the film Rowan Atkinson persuaded BMW to fit one of the three or four V16s originally developed for the 2003 Phantom saloon into the movie coupé, to which BMW agreed.

See also
 Cadillac Sixteen
 Rolls-Royce Corniche

References

100EX
Concept cars
Cars introduced in 2004
Rear-wheel-drive vehicles
Luxury vehicles
Coupés